Eastvale may refer to one of several places in the United States:

 Eastvale, California
 Eastvale, Pennsylvania
 Eastvale, Texas